Babycurus buettneri is a species of scorpions belonging to the family Buthidae.

Description
The base color is reddish brown to dark brown.

Distribution
This species is present in Cameroon, Central African Republic, Equatorial Guinea, Gabon and in the Republic of the Congo.

References

Karsch, 1886 : Skorpionologische Beiträge. I. Ueber einen sizilianischen Skorpion. II. Uebersicht der Gruppe Buthina (Androctonina). III. Ueber einen neuen Opisthacanthus (Peters). Berliner entomologische Zeitschrift, vol. 30, n. 1, p. 75–79

Animals described in 1886
Buthidae
Scorpions of Africa